The Bataafs Lyceum is a public high school in Hengelo, Netherlands. The Bataafs Lyceum is part of a public school division called the Openbare Scholengemeenschap Hengelo.

The building is located at the Sloetsweg, next to the Montessori College Twente. In 2008 the Bataafs Lyceum decided to drop the VMBO education level in order to change its name from Bataafse Kamp to Bataafs Lyceum.

In 2014/2015 the Bataafs Lyceum had about 840 students. The school teaches havo and vwo (both atheneum and gymnasium).

As of 2018, the school has about 1000 students.

In 2009, Bataafs Lyceum started with a programme for vwo students called the Masterclass. In the Masterclass, more talented pupils follow a programme for three years, focused on the development of their cognitive as well as social-emotional competences. The regular lesson scheme is more compact and there is more room for thinking outside the box and academic broadening.

Notable Batavieren 
 Mark van Vugt (1967), evolutionary psychologist
 Gerben Wynia (1958), literary essayist and biographer; editor-in-chief of Flanor
 Sander Schimmelpenninck (1984), journalist and presenter

References

External links
Official website 
Bataafs Lyceum at the Openbare Scholengemeenschap Hengelo 
Openbare Scholengemeenschap Hengelo 
Archive Bataafse Kamp 1911-2001 

Secondary schools in the Netherlands
Buildings and structures in Overijssel
Hengelo